The following is an overview of events in 1984 in film, including the highest-grossing films, award ceremonies and festivals, a list of films released and notable deaths.

The year's highest-grossing film in the United States and Canada was Beverly Hills Cop. Ghostbusters overtook it, however, with a re-release the following year. It was the first time in five years that the top-grossing film did not involve George Lucas or Steven Spielberg although Spielberg directed and Lucas executive produced/co-wrote the third placed Indiana Jones and the Temple of Doom (the highest-grossing film worldwide that year); Spielberg also executive produced the fourth placed Gremlins.

U.S. box office grosses reached $4 billion for the first time and it was the first year that two films had returned over $100 million to their distributors with both Ghostbusters and Indiana Jones and the Temple of Doom achieving this.  Beverly Hills Cop made it three for films released in 1984 after its performance during 1985 took it to rentals of $108 million. Other popular films included The NeverEnding Story, which was the most expensive film produced in West Germany, The Karate Kid and Romancing the Stone. A high number of sci-fi/fantasy films were released in 1984.

Highest-grossing films

United States

The top ten 1984 released films by box office gross in North America are as follows:

International

Events
February 15 - The Walt Disney Studios establishes Touchstone Pictures to release films with more mature subject matter than the traditional Walt Disney Pictures banner.
March 30 - Romancing the Stone is released and propels stars Kathleen Turner, Michael Douglas, and Danny DeVito and director Robert Zemeckis to super-stardom. The film also gave Zemeckis his first box office hit, which gave Universal Pictures confidence to allow him to direct his next film, Back to the Future.
April 6 - Tri-Star Pictures, a joint venture of Columbia Pictures, HBO, and CBS, releases its first film, Where the Boys Are '84.
May 4 - The first of the year's breakdancing musicals is released, Breakin'.  It is soon followed by Beat Street and its sequel, Breakin' 2: Electric Boogaloo.
July 1 - The Motion Picture Association of America institutes the PG-13 rating, as a response to violent horror films such as Gremlins and Indiana Jones and the Temple of Doom.
July 27 - Prince's first film Purple Rain is released.
August 25 - Ghostbusters becomes the biggest grossing comedy film of all time in the United States exceeding Tootsie $177.2 million going on to gross $229.2 million in its initial run.  It is overtaken by Beverly Hills Cop in summer 1985 but regains the record after its re-release in August 1985. It also became the biggest grossing film released by Columbia Pictures.
September 22 - Michael Eisner leaves Paramount Pictures to become head of Walt Disney Productions, while Frank Wells became chief operating officer and Jeffrey Katzenberg was later named chairman.
October 8 - Ned Tanen becomes president of Paramount Pictures motion picture group.
December 5 - Beverly Hills Cop is released. It will go on to become the 6th highest-grossing film of all time in the U.S. at the time, the highest grossing comedy of all time at the time, as well as the highest grossing R-Rated film of all time, a record it would hold for 19 years.
December 14 - Dune is released after over a year of hype and anticipation.
Annie's Coming Out wins 3 Australian Film Institute Awards including the Australian Film Institute Award for Best Film.

Awards

Golden Raspberry Awards:
Worst Picture: Bolero
Worst Director: John Derek - Bolero
Worst Actor: Sylvester Stallone - Rhinestone
Worst Actress: Bo Derek - Bolero
Worst Supporting Actor: Brooke Shields (with a moustache) - Sahara
Worst Supporting Actress: Lynn-Holly Johnson - Where the Boys Are '84
Worst Screenplay: John Derek - Bolero

Palme d'Or (Cannes Film Festival):
Paris, Texas, directed by Wim Wenders, France / West Germany

Golden Lion (Venice Film Festival):
A Year of the Quiet Sun (Rok spokojnego slonca), directed by Krzysztof Zanussi, Poland

Golden Bear (Berlin Film Festival):
Love Streams, directed by John Cassavetes, United States

1984 Wide-release films in the U.S.

January–March

April–June

July–September

October–December

Notable films released in 1984
United States unless stated

#
1984, directed by Michael Radford, starring John Hurt and Richard Burton - (U.K.)
2010, directed by Peter Hyams, starring Roy Scheider, John Lithgow, Bob Balaban, Dana Elcar, Helen Mirren

A
Aaj Ki Awaaz (Today's Voice), directed by Ravi Chopra, starring Raj Babbar, Smita Patil, and Nana Patekar (India)
Abnormal Family: Older Brother's Bride, directed by Masayuki Suo, starring Ren Osugi (Japan)
The Adventures of Buckaroo Banzai, directed by W. D. Richter, starring Peter Weller and Jeff Goldblum
After the Rehearsal (Efter repetitionen), directed by Ingmar Bergman, starring Erland Josephson, Ingrid Thulin, Lena Olin - (Sweden)
Against All Odds, directed by Taylor Hackford, starring Jeff Bridges, Rachel Ward, James Woods, Alex Karras, Richard Widmark, Jane Greer
All of Me, directed by Carl Reiner, starring Steve Martin and Lily Tomlin
Alley Cat, co-directed by Victor M. Ordonez, Eduardo Palmos, and Al Valletta, starring Karin Mani, and Robert Torti
Amadeus, directed by Miloš Forman, starring F. Murray Abraham and Tom Hulce - Academy and Golden Globe (drama) Awards for Best Picture
The Ambassador, directed by J. Lee Thompson, starring Robert Mitchum, Rock Hudson and Ellen Burstyn
American Dreamer, directed by Rick Rosenthal, starring JoBeth Williams
Annie's Coming Out, starring Angela Punch McGregor - (Australia)
Another Country, starring Rupert Everett and Colin Firth - (U.K.)
The Annunciation (Angyali üdvözlet) - (Hungary)
Asesinato en el Senado de la Nación (Murder in the Senate) - (Argentina)

B
Bachelor Party, starring Tom Hanks, Adrian Zmed, Tawny Kitaen
Bad Manners, aka Growing Pains, starring Martin Mull and Karen Black
Balkan Spy (Balkanski spijun) - (Yugoslavia)
Ballad of the Little Soldier (Ballade vom kleinen Soldaten), a documentary film about child soldiers directed by Werner Herzog - (West Germany)
The Bay Boy, starring Liv Ullmann and Kiefer Sutherland - (Canada/France) - Genie Award for Best Canadian Motion Picture.
Bayan Ko:This Is My Country (Bayan ko: Kapit sa patalim) - (Philippines)
Beat Street, starring Rae Dawn Chong
Before Stonewall, a documentary film
Best Defense, starring Dudley Moore, Eddie Murphy, Kate Capshaw
Beverly Hills Cop, directed by Martin Brest, starring Eddie Murphy, Judge Reinhold, Ronny Cox, John Ashton, Bronson Pinchot
Beyond the Walls (Me'Ahorei Hasoragim) - (Israel)
Bianca, directed by and starring Nanni Moretti - (Italy)
Bicycles Are for the Summer - (Spain)
Birdy, directed by Alan Parker, starring Matthew Modine and Nicolas Cage, music from Peter Gabriel
Blame It on Rio, directed by Stanley Donen, starring Michael Caine, Joseph Bologna, Demi Moore, Michelle Johnson
Blind Date, starring Kirstie Alley
Blood Simple, directed by Joel and Ethan Coen (debut), starring John Getz, Dan Hedaya, Frances McDormand, M. Emmet Walsh
Body Double, directed by Brian De Palma, starring Craig Wasson, Melanie Griffith, Deborah Shelton, Gregg Henry
Bolero, starring Bo Derek
The Bostonians, directed by James Ivory, starring Christopher Reeve, Vanessa Redgrave, Jessica Tandy - (US/UK)
The Bounty, directed by Roger Donaldson, starring Mel Gibson, Anthony Hopkins, Laurence Olivier, Daniel Day-Lewis, Liam Neeson - (U.K.)
Breakin'
Breakin' 2: Electric Boogaloo
Broadway Danny Rose - directed by and starring Woody Allen, with Mia Farrow, Jeff Daniels, Danny Aiello
The Brother from Another Planet, directed by John Sayles, starring Joe Morton
The Buddy System, starring Richard Dreyfuss, Susan Sarandon, Wil Wheaton, Nancy Allen

C
C.H.U.D., starring John Heard and Daniel Stern
Cal, starring John Lynch and Helen Mirren - (U.K.)
Camila, directed by María Luisa Bemberg - (Argentina)
Cannonball Run II, starring Burt Reynolds, Dom DeLuise, Shirley MacLaine, Sammy Davis Jr., Dean Martin, Frank Sinatra
Caravan of Courage: An Ewok Adventure, a television film starring Warwick Davis
Carmen, a cinematic opera directed by Francesco Rosi, starring Plácido Domingo - (France/Italy)
The Chain, directed by Jack Gold - (U.K.)
Chaos (Kaos) - (Italy)
The Children (Les enfants), directed by Marguerite Duras - (France)
Children of the Corn, starring Peter Horton and Linda Hamilton
Choose Me, directed by Alan Rudolph, starring Lesley Ann Warren, Geneviève Bujold, Keith Carradine
Ciske de Rat (Ciske the Rat) - (Netherlands)
City Heat, directed by Richard Benjamin, starring Clint Eastwood, Burt Reynolds, Madeline Kahn, Jane Alexander, Richard Roundtree, Rip Torn
Cloak & Dagger, starring Henry Thomas, Dabney Coleman, Michael Murphy
Comfort and Joy, directed by Bill Forsyth, starring Bill Paterson - (U.K.)
The Company of Wolves, directed by Neil Jordan, starring Stephen Rea, Angela Lansbury, Sarah Patterson - (U.K.)
Conan the Destroyer, directed by Richard Fleischer, starring Arnold Schwarzenegger, Wilt Chamberlain, Grace Jones, Olivia d'Abo
The Coolangatta Gold - (Australia)
Le Cop, starring Philippe Noiret - (France)
The Cotton Club, directed by Francis Ford Coppola, starring Richard Gere, Gregory Hines, Diane Lane, James Remar, Bob Hoskins, Fred Gwynne, Nicolas Cage
Country, directed by Richard Pearce, starring Jessica Lange and Sam Shepard
Crackers, directed by Louis Malle, starring Donald Sutherland and Sean Penn
Crimes of Passion, directed by Ken Russell, starring Kathleen Turner and Anthony Perkins

D
The Dark Glow of the Mountains (Gasherbrum - Der leuchtende Berg), directed by Werner Herzog - (West Germany)
The Descendant of the Snow Leopard (Potomok belogo barsa) - (U.S.S.R.)
La diagonale du fou (Dangerous Moves), starring Michel Piccoli - (France/Switzerland) - Academy Award for Foreign Language Film
Diary for My Children (Napló gyermekeimnek) - (Hungary)
Draw!, starring Kirk Douglas, James Coburn, Alexandra Bastedo, Graham Jarvis, Derek McGrath, Linda Sorenson
Dreamscape, starring Dennis Quaid, Kate Capshaw, Max von Sydow, Christopher Plummer
Dune, directed by David Lynch, starring Kyle MacLachlan, Sting, Sean Young, Francesca Annis, Jürgen Prochnow, Kenneth McMillan, José Ferrer, Max von Sydow

E
Electric Dreams, starring Virginia Madsen and Bud Cort
The Element of Crime (Forbrydelsens element), directed by Lars von Trier - (Denmark)
The Evil That Men Do, directed by J. Lee Thompson, starring Charles Bronson

F
Falling in Love, directed by Ulu Grosbard, starring Robert De Niro and Meryl Streep
Farewell to the Ark (Saraba hakobune) - (Japan)
Fear City, directed by Abel Ferrara, starring Tom Berenger and Billy Dee Williams
Finders Keepers, starring Michael O'Keefe, Beverly D'Angelo, Louis Gossett Jr.
Firestarter, directed by Mark L. Lester, starring Drew Barrymore, David Keith, George C. Scott, Martin Sheen, Heather Locklear
Firstborn, starring Peter Weller, Christopher Collet, Teri Garr
The Flamingo Kid, directed by Garry Marshall, starring Matt Dillon and Héctor Elizondo
Flashpoint, starring Kris Kristofferson, Treat Williams, Rip Torn, Kevin Conway, Jean Smart, Tess Harper, Kurtwood Smith, Miguel Ferrer
Flowers of Reverie (Szirmok, virágok, koszorúk) - (Hungary)
Flügel und Fesseln, directed by Helma Sanders-Brahms - (West Germany)
Footloose, directed by Herbert Ross, starring Kevin Bacon, Lori Singer, John Lithgow, Chris Penn, Dianne Wiest
Formula of Love (Formula lyubvi) - (U.S.S.R.)
Frankenweenie, directed by Tim Burton
Friday the 13th: The Final Chapter, directed by Joseph Zito, starring Kimberly Beck and Corey Feldman
Full Moon in Paris (Les Nuits de la pleine lune), directed by Éric Rohmer - (France)
The Funeral aka Death Japanese Style - (Japan)

G
Gallavants
Garbo Talks, directed by Sidney Lumet, starring Anne Bancroft, Ron Silver, Carrie Fisher, Catherine Hicks
Ghostbusters, directed by Ivan Reitman, starring Bill Murray, Dan Aykroyd, Harold Ramis, Sigourney Weaver, Rick Moranis, Ernie Hudson
Give My Regards to Broad Street - written by and starring Paul McCartney, with Ringo Starr - (U.K.)
Grandview, U.S.A., starring Jamie Lee Curtis, C. Thomas Howell, Patrick Swayze
Gremlins, directed by Joe Dante, starring Zach Galligan and Phoebe Cates
Greystoke: The Legend of Tarzan, Lord of the Apes, directed by Hugh Hudson, starring Christopher Lambert, Andie MacDowell, Ralph Richardson in his final role - (U.K.)

H
Hard to Hold, starring Rick Springfield
Harry & Son, directed by and starring Paul Newman, with Robby Benson, Ellen Barkin, Judith Ivey, Ossie Davis, Joanne Woodward
Heartbreakers, starring Peter Coyote, Nick Mancuso, Kathryn Harrold, Max Gail, Carol Wayne
Henry IV (Enrico IV), starring Marcello Mastroianni and Claudia Cardinale - Italy
The Hit, directed by Stephen Frears, starring John Hurt and Terence Stamp - (U.K.)
The Holy Innocents (Los santos inocentes) - (Spain)
The Hotel New Hampshire, directed by Tony Richardson, starring Rob Lowe, Jodie Foster, Nastassja Kinski, Beau Bridges, Matthew Modine

I
Iceman, directed by Fred Schepisi, starring Timothy Hutton, John Lone, Lindsay Crouse
The Ice Pirates, starring Robert Urich and Mary Crosby
Indiana Jones and the Temple of Doom, directed by Steven Spielberg, starring Harrison Ford and Kate Capshaw
Irreconcilable Differences, starring Ryan O'Neal, Shelley Long, Drew Barrymore

J
The Jesse Owens Story, starring Dorian Harewood
John the Fearless (Jan zonder vrees) - (Belgium)
Johnny Dangerously, starring Michael Keaton, Marilu Henner, Joe Piscopo, Danny DeVito, Maureen Stapleton, Peter Boyle
Just the Way You Are, starring Kristy McNichol

K
The Karate Kid, directed by John G. Avildsen, starring Ralph Macchio and Pat Morita
Kidco, starring Scott Schwartz
The Killing Fields, directed by Roland Joffé, starring Sam Waterston, John Malkovich, Haing S. Ngor - (U.K.) - British Academy Award for Best Film
Klassenverhältnisse, directed by Straub-Huillet - (France/West Germany)

L
Lassiter, starring Tom Selleck and Jane Seymour
The Last Days of Pompeii, TV miniseries, starring Laurence Olivier, Olivia Hussey, Siobhán McKenna, Franco Nero, Ned Beatty, Nicholas Clay, Ernest Borgnine
The Last Starfighter, starring Lance Guest, Robert Preston, Catherine Mary Stewart
The Little Drummer Girl, directed by George Roy Hill, starring Diane Keaton
Loafing and Camouflage (Lufa ke Paralayi) - (Greece)
The Lonely Guy, starring Steve Martin and Charles Grodin
Love and Pigeons (Lyubov i golubi) - (U.S.S.R.)
Love Letters, starring Jamie Lee Curtis
Love Streams, directed by and starring John Cassavetes, with Gena Rowlands and Seymour Cassel - Golden Bear award winner

M
MacArthur's Children (Setouchi Shōnen Yakyū-dan) - (Japan)
Macross: Do You Remember Love? (Chōjikū Yōsai Makurosu: Ai Oboete Imasu ka) - (Japan)
Making the Grade, starring Judd Nelson
The Man from Majorca (Mannen från Mallorca), directed by Bo Widerberg - (Sweden)
A Man of Principle (Cóndores no entierran todos los días) - (Colombia)
Man Under Suspicion (Morgen in Alabama), starring Maximilian Schell - (West Germany)
Maria's Lovers, starring Nastassja Kinski, John Savage, Robert Mitchum
Mashaal, starring Dilip Kumar and Anil Kapoor - (India)
The Masks of Death (British) Sherlock Holmes mystery directed by Roy Ward Baker for Tyburn Films, starring Peter Cushing as Holmes and John Mills as Watson; co-starred Anton Diffring, Susan Penhaligon and Anne Baxter
Mass Appeal, starring Jack Lemmon, Željko Ivanek, Charles Durning
Meatballs Part II, starring Richard Mulligan, Hamilton Camp, John Mengatti, Kim Richards, Archie Hahn, Misty Rowe, John Larroquette, Paul Reubens, Joe Nipote, Jason Hervey, Elayne Boosler, Nancy Glass, Felix Silla, Donald Gibb
Mermaid Legend (Ningyo Densetsu) - (Japan)
Micki & Maude, directed by Blake Edwards, starring Dudley Moore, Ann Reinking, Amy Irving
Mike's Murder, directed by James Bridges, starring Debra Winger
The Miracle of Joe Petrel (Umitsubame Jyo no kiseki) - (Japan)
Missing in Action, starring Chuck Norris
Misunderstood, starring Henry Thomas and Gene Hackman
Moscow on the Hudson, directed by Paul Mazursky, starring Robin Williams
Mrs. Soffel, directed by Gillian Armstrong, starring Diane Keaton and Mel Gibson
The Muppets Take Manhattan, directed by Frank Oz
My First Wife, starring John Hargreaves - (Australia)

N
The Naked Face, starring Roger Moore, Rod Steiger, Elliott Gould, Anne Archer, Art Carney
The Natural, directed by Barry Levinson, starring Robert Redford, Robert Duvall, Glenn Close, Barbara Hershey, Kim Basinger, Wilford Brimley, Richard Farnsworth
Nausicaä of the Valley of the Wind (Kaze no Tani no Naushika) - (Japan)
The NeverEnding Story (Die Unendliche Geschichte) - directed by Wolfgang Petersen, starring Barret Oliver and Noah Hathaway - (West Germany)
Night of the Comet, starring Catherine Mary Stewart and Robert Beltran
A Nightmare on Elm Street, directed by Wes Craven, starring Robert Englund, Heather Langenkamp, John Saxon, Ronee Blakley
Night Patrol, starring Linda Blair and The Unknown Comic
The Ninja Mission (Misja ninja) - (Sweden)
Nothing Lasts Forever, starring Zach Galligan, Bill Murray, Dan Aykroyd
Nothing Left to Do But Cry

O
Oh, God! You Devil, starring George Burns 
Old Enough, starring Rainbow Harvest and Danny Aiello, Sundance Grand Jury Prize
On the Top of the Cherry Tree (Gore na chereshata) - (Bulgaria)
Once Upon a Time in America, directed by Sergio Leone, starring Robert De Niro, James Woods, Elizabeth McGovern, Joe Pesci, Tuesday Weld, Treat Williams - (Italy/United States)
Opasen char (Dangerous Charm) - (Bulgaria)
Over the Brooklyn Bridge, starring Elliott Gould, Shelley Winters, Sid Caesar
Oxford Blues, starring Rob Lowe, Ally Sheedy, Gail Strickland

P
Paris, Texas, directed by Wim Wenders, starring Harry Dean Stanton and Nastassja Kinski - Palme d'Or winner
A Passage to India, directed by David Lean, starring Judy Davis, Victor Banerjee, Peggy Ashcroft, James Fox - (U.K.) - Golden Globe Award for Best Foreign Film
Pehlivan - (Turkey)
The Philadelphia Experiment, starring Michael Paré and Nancy Allen
Places in the Heart, directed by Robert Benton, starring Sally Field, Danny Glover, John Malkovich, Ed Harris, Lindsay Crouse, Amy Madigan
Police Academy, directed by Hugh Wilson, starring Steve Guttenberg, Kim Cattrall, Bubba Smith
The Pope of Greenwich Village, directed by Stuart Rosenberg, starring Eric Roberts, Mickey Rourke, Daryl Hannah, Kenneth McMillan, Geraldine Page
A Private Function, directed by Malcolm Mowbray, starring Michael Palin and Maggie Smith - (U.K.)
Protocol, starring Goldie Hawn, Chris Sarandon, Gail Strickland
Purple Hearts, directed by Sidney J. Furie, starring Ken Wahl and Cheryl Ladd
Purple Rain, starring Prince

Q
Quilombo - (Brazil)

R
Raaj Tilak, starring Raaj Kumar, Sunil Dutt, Dharmendra - (India)
The Razor's Edge, starring Bill Murray, Theresa Russell, Catherine Hicks, Denholm Elliott
Reckless, starring Aidan Quinn and Daryl Hannah
Red Dawn, directed by John Milius, starring Patrick Swayze, Charlie Sheen, Lea Thompson
Repentance (Pokayaniye) - (U.S.S.R.)
Repo Man, directed by Alex Cox, starring Emilio Estevez, Dick Rude, Harry Dean Stanton
The Return of Godzilla (also known as "Godzilla 1985") - (Japan)
Revenge of the Nerds, starring Robert Carradine, Anthony Edwards, Curtis Armstrong, Timothy Busfield
Rhinestone, starring Sylvester Stallone and Dolly Parton
The River, directed by Mark Rydell, starring Sissy Spacek and Mel Gibson
The Road to Bresson (De weg naar Bresson), starring Robert Bresson, Louis Malle, Andrei Tarkovsky, Orson Welles - (Netherlands)
Roadhouse 66, starring Willem Dafoe and Judge Reinhold
Romancing the Stone, directed by Robert Zemeckis, starring Michael Douglas and Kathleen Turner - Golden Globe Award for Best Picture (Musical or Comedy)
Ronia, the Robber's Daughter (Ronja Rövardotter) - (Sweden)
Runaway, directed by Michael Crichton, starring Tom Selleck

S
Saaransh (The Gist), directed by Mahesh Bhatt - (India)
Secret Honor, directed by Robert Altman, starring Philip Baker Hall
Sharaabi (Drunkard), directed by Prakash Mehra, starring Amitabh Bachchan - (India)
Sheena, starring Tanya Roberts
Silent Night, Deadly Night
Sixteen Candles, written and directed by John Hughes, starring Molly Ringwald, Anthony Michael Hall, Michael Schoeffling, Gedde Watanabe
Slapstick of Another Kind, starring Jerry Lewis, Madeline Kahn, Marty Feldman
Slunce, seno, jahody - (Czechoslovakia)
A Soldier's Story, directed by Norman Jewison, starring Howard E. Rollins Jr., Adolph Caesar, Denzel Washington
The Snowdrop Festival (Slavnosti sněženek), directed by Jiří Menzel - (Czechoslovakia)
Solomon Northup's Odyssey
Songwriter, starring Kris Kristofferson, Willie Nelson, Lesley Ann Warren
Splash, directed by Ron Howard, starring Tom Hanks, Daryl Hannah, John Candy
Star Trek III: The Search for Spock, directed by and starring Leonard Nimoy, with William Shatner, DeForest Kelley, Christopher Lloyd, Judith Anderson
Starman, directed by John Carpenter, starring Jeff Bridges and Karen Allen
Stop Making Sense, a concert film directed by Jonathan Demme featuring Talking Heads
Stranger Than Paradise, directed by Jim Jarmusch
Strangler vs. Strangler (Davitelj protiv davitelja) - (Yugoslavia)
Streets of Fire, directed by Walter Hill, starring Michael Paré, Diane Lane, Rick Moranis, Amy Madigan, Willem Dafoe
A Summer at Grandpa's (Dong–dong de jia qi) - (Taiwan)
A Sunday in the Country (Un dimanche à la campagne), directed by Bertrand Tavernier - (France)
Supergirl, starring Helen Slater, Faye Dunaway, Peter O'Toole
Swing Shift, directed by Jonathan Demme, starring Goldie Hawn, Kurt Russell, Christine Lahti, Ed Harris, Fred Ward
Szaffi - (Hungary)

T
The Tale of Tsar Saltan - (U.S.S.R.)
Talk to Me, directed by Julius Potocsny, starring Austin Pendleton and Michael Murphy
Tank, starring James Garner and Shirley Jones
Le Tartuffe, directed by and starring Gérard Depardieu - (France)
Teachers, starring Nick Nolte, JoBeth Williams, Judd Hirsch
The Terminator, directed by James Cameron, starring Arnold Schwarzenegger, Michael Biehn, Linda Hamilton
Terror in the Aisles, starring Donald Pleasence and Nancy Allen
Thief of Hearts, starring Steven Bauer, Barbara Williams, George Wendt
This Is My Country (Bayan ko: Kapit sa patalim) - (Philippines)
This Is Spinal Tap, directed by Rob Reiner, starring Harry Shearer, Michael McKean, Christopher Guest
Tightrope, starring Clint Eastwood and Geneviève Bujold
Top Secret!, directed by Jim Abrahams and starring Val Kilmer

U
Ultraman Story (Urutoraman Sutōr) - (Japan)
Ultraman Zoffy: Ultra Warriors vs. the Giant Monster Army - (Japan)
Under the Volcano, directed by John Huston, starring Albert Finney and Jacqueline Bisset
Unfaithfully Yours, starring Dudley Moore, Nastassja Kinski, Armand Assante, Albert Brooks
Until September, starring Karen Allen
Up the Creek, starring Tim Matheson and Jennifer Runyon

V
Veneno para las hadas (Poison for the Fairies) - (Mexico)
Vigil - (New Zealand)
Voyage of the Rock Aliens, starring Pia Zadora and Craig Sheffer
Voyage to Cythera (Taxidi sta Kythira) - (Greece)

W
W's Tragedy (W no higeki) - (Japan)
What Have I Done to Deserve This? (¿Qué he hecho yo para merecer esto?), directed by Pedro Almodóvar, starring Carmen Maura - (Spain)
Wheels on Meals (Fai Chan Tse), starring Jackie Chan and Sammo Hung - (Hong Kong)
When the Raven Flies (Hrafninn flýgur) - (Iceland)
Where the Boys Are '84, starring Lisa Hartman, Lorna Luft, Lynn-Holly Johnson, Wendy Schaal
Where the Green Ants Dream (Wo die grünen Ameisen träumen), directed by Werner Herzog - (West Germany)
The Wild Life, starring Chris Penn, Eric Stoltz and Lea Thompson
The Woman in Red, directed by and starring Gene Wilder, with Gilda Radner, Charles Grodin, Judith Ivey, Kelly LeBrock
Wreaths at the Foot of the Mountain (Gao shan xia de hua huan) - (China)

Y
A Year of the Quiet Sun (Rok spokojnego slonca) - (Poland) - Golden Lion winner
Yellow Earth (Huáng tǔdì), directed by Chen Kaige - (China)

Births
January 6
 Priit Loog, Estonian actor 
 Kate McKinnon, American actress, comedian and writer
January 8 - Steven Kanumba, Tanzanian actor and director (d. 2012) 
January 12
Taraneh Alidoosti, Iranian actress
Sam Richardson (actor), American actor, comedian, writer and producer
January 20 - Saverio Raimondo, Italian actor and comedian
January 21 - Richard Gutierrez, Filipino actor and model
January 25 - Kaiji Tang, voice actor
January 31 – Michael Aloni, Israeli actor
February 1
Abbi Jacobson, American comedian, writer, actress and illustrator
Lee Thompson Young, American actor (d. 2013)
February 8 - Cecily Strong, American actress and comedian
February 12 - Alexandra Dahlström, Swedish actress
February 13 - Brina Palencia, voice actress
February 18 - Genelle Williams, Canadian actress
February 19 - Josh Trank, American director, screenwriter and editor
February 20 - Trevor Noah, South African comedian, writer, producer, actor and television host
February 21 - Karina, Japanese model and actress
February 24 - Nicholas Saputra, Indonesian actor
March 2
Blake Anderson, American actor, comedian, producer and screenwriter
John Bernecker, American stunt performer (d. 2017)
Ian Sinclair, voice actor
March 7 - Brandon T. Jackson, American stand-up comedian, rapper, actor, and writer
March 8 - Nora-Jane Noone, Irish actress
March 10 - Olivia Wilde, American actress
March 12 - Jaimie Alexander, American actress
March 13
Rachael Bella, retired American actress
Noel Fisher, Canadian actor
March 20 - Christy Carlson Romano, American stage and film actress and singer
March 25 - Katharine McPhee, American singer and actress
March 27
Emily Ann Lloyd, American actress
Jon Paul Steuer, American actor and musician (d. 2018)
April 2 
Ashley Peldon, American actress
Shawn Roberts, Canadian actor
Deep Sidhu, Indian actor (d. 2022)
April 3 - Chrissie Fit, American actress and singer
April 8
 Taran Noah Smith, American actor
 Kirsten Storms, American actress
April 10
 Cara DeLizia, American actress
 Mandy Moore, American singer-songwriter and actress
April 16 - Claire Foy, British actress
April 18 - America Ferrera, American actress
April 25 - Jillian Bell, American comedian, actress and screenwriter
April 26 - Ryan O'Donohue, American actor
April 29 - Firass Dirani, Australian actor
May 13 - Hannah New, English actress
May 14 - Olly Murs, English singer, songwriter, composer, dancer, television presenter, voice actor and director
May 17 - Alejandro Edda, Mexican-American actor
May 21 - Marnie Schulenburg, American actress (d. 2022)
May 23 - Adam Wylie, American actor
May 29 - Kaycee Stroh, American actress and singer
May 30 - DeWanda Wise, American actress
June 1 - Taylor Handley, American actor
June 10 - Betsy Sodaro, American actress
June 13 - Phillip Van Dyke, American actor
June 19 - Paul Dano, American actor
June 21 - Shiv Panditt, Indian actor and television host
June 24 - Lucien Dodge, voice actor
June 26 
 Aubrey Plaza, American actress, comedian and producer
 Wen Zhang, Chinese actor
June 29 - Carla Medina, Mexican singer, actress and television host
June 30 - Fantasia Barrino, American singer and actress
July 1 
Jared Keeso, Canadian actor  
Cyron Melville, Danish actor and musician
July 2 - Vanessa Lee Chester, American actress
July 7 - Ross Malinger, American actor
July 9 - Hanna R. Hall, American actress
July 11
Serinda Swan, Canadian actress
Rachael Taylor, Australian actress
July 14 - Britta Soll, Estonian actress
July 17 - Mary Nighy, English actress and filmmaker
July 19 
 Alessandra De Rossi, Filipina actress
 Andrea Libman, Canadian actress, voice actress, pianist, and singer
July 20 - Jacky Heung, Hong Kong actor 
July 25 - Zawe Ashton, English actress, playwright, director and narrator
July 27 
 Taylor Schilling, American actress
 Kenny Wormald, American actor
July 28 - John David Washington, American actor and producer
July 29 - J. Madison Wright Morris, American actress (d. 2006)
July 30
 Gina Rodriguez, American actress and director
 Gabrielle Christian, American actress and singer
August 3 - Jon Foster, American actor and musician
August 7 – Hsu Wei-ning, Taiwanese actress and model  
August 10 – Mariel Rodriguez, Filipina actress and model  
August 12 – Marian Rivera, Filipino actress
August 15 - Quinton Aaron, American actor
August 19 - Simon Bird, English actor, director and comedian
August 28 – Him Law, Hong Kong actor
September 3
Garrett Hedlund, American actor
Paz de la Huerta, American actress and model
September 4 - Kyle Mooney, American actor, comedian and writer
September 5 - Annabelle Wallis, English actress
September 10 - Luke Treadaway, British actor and singer
September 14
Adam Lamberg, American actor
Ayushmann Khurrana, Indian actor
September 17 - Mark Shandii Bacolod, Filipino director and producer (d. 2022)
September 18 - Nina Arianda, American actress
September 19
Lydia Hearst, American actress and model
Kevin Zegers, Canadian actor and model
September 22 - Laura Vandervoort, Canadian actress
September 22 - Jordan Vogt-Roberts, American film director
September 23 - Anneliese van der Pol, Dutch-American actress and singer
September 25 - Zach Woods, American actor and comedian
September 27 - Avril Lavigne, Canadian singer-songwriter
October 1 - Beck Bennett, American actor, comedian and writer
October 2 - John Morris, American actor
October 3
Chris Marquette, American actor
Ashlee Simpson, American actress and singer
October 4 - Will Theakston, former English actor
October 5 - Nathalie Kelley, Peruvian actress
October 7 - Andy Bean (actor), American actor
October 10 - Chiaki Kuriyama, Japanese actress and singer
October 14 - Jason Davis, American actor (d. 2020)
October 18 - Freida Pinto, Indian actress
October 25 - Katy Perry, American singer-songwriter and actress
October 27 - Kelly Osbourne, English actress and singer
October 28 - Finn Wittrock, American actor and screenwriter
November 1 - Natalia Tena, English actress and musician
November 6 - Patina Miller, American actress and singer
November 10 - Britt Irvin, Canadian actress and voice artist
November 13 - Sarah Rose Karr, American former child actress
November 15 - Asia Kate Dillon, American actor
November 16 - Kimberly J. Brown, American actress
November 17 - Lauren Maltby, American actress
November 18 - Nayanthara, Indian actress
November 21
 Lindsey Haun, American actress and singer
 Jena Malone, American actress
November 22 - Scarlett Johansson, American actress
November 23 - Lucas Grabeel, American actor and singer
November 25 - Gaspard Ulliel, French actor (d. 2022)
November 28 - Mary Elizabeth Winstead, American actress
December 5 - Lauren London, American actress
December 11 - Sandra Echeverría, Mexican actress and singer
December 14 - Jackson Rathbone, American actor, singer and musician
December 16 - Theo James, English actor and producer
December 17 - Tennessee Thomas, British drummer and actress
December 19 - Ankita Lokhande, Indian actress
December 23 - Alison Sudol, American actress, singer and songwriter
December 24 - Austin Stowell, American actor
December 25 - Georgia Tennant, English actress
December 29 - Chris Pang, Australian actor and producer

Deaths

Film debuts
Marshall Bell - Birdy
Geoffrey Blake - The Last Starfighter
Jesse Bradford - Falling in Love
Ralph Brown - The Hit
Simon Callow - Amadeus
Jennifer Connelly - Once Upon a Time in America
Jon Cryer - No Small Affair
Isaach de Bankolé - Asphalt Warriors
Johnny Depp - A Nightmare on Elm Street
Tate Donovan - No Small Affair
Richard Edson - Stranger Than Paradise
Troy Evans - Rhinestone
Rupert Everett - Another Country
Sherilyn Fenn - The Wild Life 
Colin Firth - Another Country
Courtney Gains - Children of the Corn 
Sarah Michelle Gellar - Over the Brooklyn Bridge
Bobcat Goldthwait - Massive Retaliation
Gilbert Gottfried - The House of God
Heather Graham - Mrs. Soffel
Seth Green - Billions for Boris
Arye Gross - Exterminator 2
Corey Haim - Firstborn
Kadeem Hardison - Beat Street
Val Kilmer - Top Secret!
Andie MacDowell - Greystoke: The Legend of Tarzan, Lord of the Apes
Kyle MacLachlan - Dune
Frances McDormand - Blood Simple
Olga Merediz - The Brother from Another Planet
Alyssa Milano - Old Enough
Connie Nielsen - Par où t'es rentré ? On t'a pas vu sortir
Chazz Palminteri - Home Free All
Lou Diamond Phillips - Interface
Aidan Quinn - Reckless
Tim Robbins - Toy Soldiers
Tim Roth - The Hit
Emmanuelle Seigner - Year of the Jellyfish
Charlie Sheen - Red Dawn
Craig Sheffer - Voyage of the Rock Aliens
Alexander Skarsgård - Åke and His World
Ice-T - Breakin'
Brian Thompson - The Terminator
Jennifer Tilly - No Small Affair
Marisa Tomei - The Flamingo Kid
Tracey Ullman - Give My Regards to Broad Street
Ken Watanabe - MacArthur's Children
Alicia Witt - Dune
Steven Weber - The Flamingo Kid
Michelle Yeoh - The Owl vs Bombo

See also
 List of American films of 1984
 List of British films of 1984
 List of French films of 1984
 List of German films of the 1980s
 List of Bollywood films of 1984
 List of Italian films of 1984
 List of Japanese films of 1984
 List of Swedish films of the 1980s

Notes

References

External links
 "Was 1984 the greatest year in movies ever?" by Chris Nashawaty - Entertainment Weekly online
1984 Domestic Grosses at Box Office Mojo
Top 1984 Movies at the Domestic Box Office at The Numbers
Top 1984 Movies at the International Box Office at The Numbers
Top 1984 Movies at the Worldwide Box Office at The Numbers
Top-US-Grossing Titles Released 1984-01-01 to 1984-12-31 at IMDb
Most Popular Feature Films Released 1984-01-01 to 1984-12-31 at IMDb

 
Film by year